Elymus was the supposed Trojan ancestor of the Elymians, an indigenous people of Sicily, in Greek and Roman legend.

Legends
Elymus was a Trojan, a natural son of Anchises and a brother of Eryx. Previous to the emigration of Aeneas, also a son of Anchises, Elymus and Acestes had fled from Troy to Sicily, and had settled on the banks of the river Crinisus, in the country of the Sicani. When afterwards the Trojan refugees led by Aeneas also arrived there, Elymus built for them the towns of Segesta and Elyme, and the Trojans who settled in that part of Sicily called themselves Elymi, after Elymus.

Strabo calls him Elymnus, and says that he went to Sicily with Aeneas, and that they together took possession of the cities of Eryx and Lilybaeum. Elymus was further believed to have founded Asca and Entella in Sicily.

In the Aeneid, Vergil has Elymnus competing in the funeral games held on Sicily for Anchises, in the footrace in which Nisus and Euryalus are introduced. As Helymus, he is also listed among the competitors by Hyginus, who says he finished second to Euryalus and was awarded an Amazonian quiver.

References

Citations

Bibliography
 

Trojans
Ancient Sicily
Characters in the Aeneid
Sicilian characters in Greek mythology